Isonzo is a team-based multiplayer first-person shooter video game set on the Italian Front during World War I. It was released on Steam, the Epic Games Store, PlayStation 4, PlayStation 5, Xbox One and Xbox Series X/S on September 13, 2022. It is the sequel to Verdun and Tannenberg.

Isonzo is inspired by the Battles of the Isonzo on the Italian Front which took place between 1915 and 1917. The game includes historically accurate World War I weapons, authentic uniforms and equipment, detailed injury and gore modeling, and maps based on the real battlefields of the Southern Front.

The game runs on the Unity engine and was initially developed by independent studios M2H and Blackmill Games. Since the purchase of the series by Focus Entertainment, the game is being developed solely by Blackmill Games.

A free update was released on December 5 2022, for all platforms: the Caporetto Update added a new Offensive with one map to the game, and a new German faction with their own weapons, equipment and uniforms.

Gameplay
Isonzo is a tactical team-based multiplayer game with up to 48 players on PC, and 40 players on consoles. Players can choose from six classes, with some classes limited in number. Each class can choose from a different selection of weapons, equipment items like ammunition boxes or grenades, and perks which grant special abilities or bonuses to certain actions. The Officer class can fire flares to mark locations, and then use field telephones to call in support abilities like artillery barrages, creeping barrages, poison gas, smoke screens and aircraft including heavy bombers. Players can stand, crouch and crawl, as well as being able to mantle up a limited distance vertically onto flat surfaces.

The main game mode in Isonzo is the Offensive mode. One team will be attacking and attempting to destroy objectives or capture locations through a series of defensive lines. If the attackers complete the final defensive line, they win, while if the attackers run out of lives the defenders will win. Each Offensive game is based on a historicla includes a number of individual battles  for Offensives with multiple battles, winning earlier battles will make later battles easier for the attackers.

Reception

Isonzo was met with "mixed or average" reception according to video game review aggregator Metacritic, on platforms where it received enough reviews for a rating. However, it currently enjoys 85 % positive reviews by players on Steam.

References

External links 

 

2022 video games